Sieber may refer to:

 Sieber (surname)
 Sieber (river), a river in the Harz mountains of Germany
 Sieber (Herzberg am Harz), a village in Lower Saxony, Germany
 Sozialwerke Pfarrer Sieber, a Swiss charity and relief organization founded by Pastor Ernst Sieber